Cheẑichʼed Biny, known as Chilcotin Lake, is a lake in the Chilcotin District of the Central Interior of British Columbia, Canada.  It is located on the Chilcotin River to the north of Puntzi Lake.

The name is derived from that of the Chilcotin River, which in turn is derived from an anglicization of Tsilhqotʼin, the name of the local indigenous people, whose name in their language means "People of the rocks".

The community of Chezacut (Cheẑichʼed in Tsilhqotʼin language) is located on the north shore of the lake, as is Chezacut Cemetery Indian Reserve No. 5 nearby.  Many other reserves of the Alexis Creek First Nation are also in the vicinity, generally to the west and northwest.

See also
Chilcotin (disambiguation)

References

Lakes of the Chilcotin
Range 3 Coast Land District